Ghiyath al-Din Pir Ahmad Khvafi was a Persian statesman who was the vizier of the Timurid ruler Shah Rukh from 1417 to 1447. He played a key role in reforming the Timurid bureaucratic administration. After his vizierate ended, he worked under several Timurid princes, including Abdal-Latif Mirza, Ala al-Dawla Mirza, Sultan-Muhammad and Abul-Qasim Babur Mirza. He died in 1453.

He was survived by his son, Majd al-Din Muhammad Khvafi, who was also vizier.

References

Sources 
 
 

Officials of the Timurid Empire
Viziers of the Timurid Empire
15th-century Iranian people
1453 deaths
Year of birth unknown